Hugh B. Webster (August 6, 1943 – March 4, 2022) was an accountant, farmer, register of deeds, and North Carolina state senator from Caswell County, North Carolina. As a state senator, he represented North Carolina's 24th Senate district from 1995 to 2006, which included constituents in Alamance, Caswell, and parts of Person counties.

Biography

Personal life and political career
Hugh Webster graduated from Bartlett Yancey High School in Yanceyville, North Carolina in 1961. He joined the US Army, serving two years. Webster attended the University of North Carolina at Chapel Hill, where he received a Bachelor of Science in 1968 and a Specialty in Accounting graduate certificate in 1969.

After passing the CPA exam in 1969, Webster was an auditor and tax specialist for major accounting firms in the U.S., Latin America, and South Africa. He also did contract audit work for the U.S. Departments of Defense and Labor in the U.S. and in Germany.

Webster worked for 30 years as a self-employed accountant in Yanceyville, providing tax preparation and small business services. He also worked as a farmer, raising tobacco, grain, and cattle.

In 1995, Webster became a North Carolina state senator after defeating George Daniel, an eight-year incumbent Democrat. He was the first Republican from Caswell County since John W. Stephens in 1868 to be elected to the state senate. (Stephens' assassination in 1870 provoked the Kirk–Holden War). Webster served six terms as a state senator until he narrowly lost his re-election bid by 460 votes to Democrat Tony Foriest on November 7, 2006.

During his 12 years in the North Carolina General Assembly, Webster served on various committees, including finance and appropriations, environment and natural resources, and agriculture. He worked on several bills affecting state taxes.

Webster notably sponsored a bill called "The Baby Greer Act," which would have allowed prosecutors to charge those accused of murdering pregnant women with double homicide. A similar bill called the Unborn Victims of Violence Act or Ethen's Law was later passed by the state legislature in 2011.

In 2008, Webster challenged U.S. Rep. Brad Miller to represent North Carolina's 13th congressional district. His campaign issues included immigration, reducing federal spending, and protecting constitutional rights such as free speech and gun ownership. He was defeated by Miller, with the incumbent receiving nearly 66 percent of the district vote.

In November 2008, Webster was indicted on a felony embezzlement charge.  He was acquitted by a jury in 2009.

In 2011, Webster was appointed register of deeds for Alamance County, North Carolina and was re-elected twice until stepping down in 2021.

Webster had two children with his wife Patricia: LeGrand and Noel. In 2021, he and his wife separated. Webster was a resident of Burlington, North Carolina.

References

External links

|-

1943 births
Living people
Republican Party North Carolina state senators
People from Burlington, North Carolina
21st-century American politicians
People from Yanceyville, North Carolina